V. nana may refer to:
 Vicia nana, a flowering plant species found in South America
 Vampirolepis nana, a synonym for Hymenolepis nana, the dwarf tapeworm, a cosmopolitan cestode species that is one of the most common cestodes of humans in the world

See also
 Nana (disambiguation)